Oxemberg is a formal & casual clothing brand for men from the house of Siyaram's. Its corporate headquarters are located in Mumbai, India.

Operations & Availability
Oxemberg operates mainly through multi-brand  outlets with approximately 2000 outlets pan India.
The apparels are available at all large format outlets like, Central, Reliance Trends, Max, Hypercity, More & LuLu's; at 140+ exclusive Siyaram's Shops and 110 exclusive Oxemberg outlets spread across India.

Brand ambassador
Saif Ali Khan has been signed as the latest brand ambassador for Oxemberg in May 2013.

References

Clothing brands of India
Companies based in Mumbai
Companies with year of establishment missing